Margaret Helen Harper (9 February 1919 - 13 October 2014) was an American computer programmer who worked with Grace Hopper at Remington Rand to develop one of the first computer compilers. Harper was born in Michigan, but lived most of her life in Pennsylvania. She attended Wellesley College and graduated from the University of Pennsylvania in 1940. She worked as a programmer and then as a professor.

Early life and education 
Harper was born in Michigan, but grew up in Pennsylvania. Her parents were Paul Harper (b. 1892) and Katharine Harper (b. 1893). Paul worked at an auto dealership, and Katharine was a musician and a stay-at-home mother. Margaret had an adopted younger brother named Richard Irving Harper (13 March 1927 - November 1977). Margaret was encouraged in her studies as a child, but she lamented that she wasn't very artistic. Margaret attended both public and private schools before her college years. For college, Margaret first attended Wellesley College, but then transferred to the University of Pennsylvania. Margaret was active in sports, and played on the Wellesley College and University of Pennsylvania women's hockey teams. Margaret graduated in 1940 with a Bachelor of Science from the University of Pennsylvania's School of Education where she studied chemistry.

Career 

It is not clear how Harper got involved in computer science, but by the 1950s she was working as a developer.

Computer science is by and large a discipline of collaboration, and the development process in the late 1940s and early 1950s was no different in that respect. In the early 1950s when Grace Hopper was developing the first compilers, she was aided by Harper and Richard K. Ridgway. Hopper even stated that "this work is necessarily group research, and this account cannot be published without citing those members…primarily responsible for the achievement of these results". This is important to note, because much of Harper's contribution has been overshadowed by the Matilda Effect of Grace Hopper's fame. In 1952, Harper, Ridgway, and Hopper were all working at Remington Rand on the A series of compilers for the UNIVAC system. Specifically, Harper and Ridgway prepared the manual for and worked on the A-2 compiler.

Harper also published her article "Subroutines: Prefabricated Blocks for Building" in the March 1954 issue of Computers and Automation. In her article, Harper starts off by saying how the 1950s computer programmer has essentially been like a "settler in America" who must make every bit of his house by hand, right down to the pegs that hold the house together! She continues by noting that the times have changed, and now programmers are working together not from the fine pegs of a house, but by using the tools and ideas that others discovered in the past. She stresses the importance of subroutines in computer programming—the idea that larger tasks can be broken down into smaller (sub) segments—but goes on to note that "the absence of a compiler [for subroutines] has meant that subroutines have been coded to function only in a fixed portion of the computer's storage or memory." This was problematic, because it meant that a lot of code was simply not reusable. The computers that we know and recognize today (in the 2000s) could not function without this reusable code. But in 1954 Harper had the foresight to ask, "If Russian can be translated into English…why not one computer code into another?" This was the crux of the issue with in the idea of compiler design and implementation. Although Harper did not invent the compiler, she was a part of one of the earliest teams of scientists who would imagine and build the first compilers. The New Scientist from 17 September 1987 states that one of the first people to implement the new compilers was Harper.

After Harper finished work with Hopper and Ridgway at Remington Rand, she continued as a programming analyst at Auerbach Corporation in the 1960s. She was among those listed in the Who's Who in the Computer Field for 1963-64 and the Who's Who in Computers and Data Processing for 1971. After working for Auerbach, she taught at the university of a Pennsylvania and later retired.

She died in 2014 in Pennsylvania at the age of 95.

References

Citations

Sources 

 1930 Census Place: Upper Darby, Delaware, Pennsylvania; Page: 3A; Enumeration District: 0163; FHL microfilm: 2341768.
 1939: Arrival: New York, New York, USA; Microfilm Serial: T715, 1897–1957; Line: 24; Page Number: 135.
 1948: New York, New York, USA; Microfilm Serial: T715, 1897-1957: Line: 8; Page Number: 115.
 Ancestry.com. 1930 United States Federal Census [database on-line]. Provo, UT; Ancestry.com Operations Inc., 2002.
 Ancestry.com. New York, Passenger and Crew Lists (including Castle Garden and Ellis Island), 1820-1957 [database on-line]. Provo, UT: Ancestry.com Operations, Inc., 2010.
 Ancestry.com. U.S., Obituary Collection, 1930-Current [database on-line]. Lehi, UT, USA: Ancestry.com Operations Inc, 2006.
 Ancestry.com. US Public Records Index, 1950–1993, vol. 1 [database on-line]. Provo, UT: Ancestry.com Operations, Inc., 2010.
 Biography Index. vol. 9, September 1970-August 1973  (Published 1974) — New York: H.W. Wilson Co.
 Chun, Wendy Hui Kyong. 2011 — Programmed Visions: Software and Memory — Cambridge, Mass.: The MIT Press.
 Harper, Margaret H. "Subroutines: Prefabricated Blocks for Building" Computers and Automation, vol. 3, no. 3, March 3, 1954, pp. 14–15.
 Massachusetts Institute of Technology Summer Session 1954: Digital Computers, Advanced Coding Techniques — MIT Digital Computer Laboratory of the Department of Electrical Engineering and the Office of Naval Research, Cambridge, Mass., Summer 1954.
 Nofre, D., Priestley, M., & Alberts, G. "When Technology Became Language: The Origins of the Linguistic Conception of Computer Programming, 1950-1960." Technology and Culture, vol. 55, no. 1, January 2014, pp. 40–75.
 "Richard Harper - November 1977 - Obituary - Tributes.com" www.tributes.com. Retrieved 2020-11-09.
 "Richard K. Ridgway - Home". dl.acm.org. Retrieved 2020-11-09.
 Stanley, Autumn. 1995 — Mothers and Daughters of Invention: Notes for a Revised History of Technology  — New Brunswick, New Jersey: Rutgers University Press.
 Stein, Dorothy. (17 September 1987). "Sex and the COBOL Cabal". New Scientist. vol. 115 no. 1578. pp. 79.
 Symposium on Automatic Programming for Digital Computers by the Navy Mathematical Computing Advisory Panel — Published by Office of Naval Research, Department of the Navy, Washington D.C., May 13–14, 1954.
 University of Pennsylvania Women's Yearbook, 1940. archives.upenn.edu, 1940, pp. 39.
 "The Wellesley Legenda 1937 | Wellesley College Digital Collections". repository.wellesley.edu. Retrieved 2020-11-09.
 Who's Who in Computers and Data Processing. vol. 1, 1971 — Chicago: Quadrangle Books.
 Who's Who in the Computer Field. 1963-64 — Newtonville, Mass.: Berkeley Enterprises.

American computer programmers
American women computer scientists
American computer scientists
History of computing
Compilers
University of Pennsylvania alumni
Wellesley College alumni
1919 births
2014 deaths
20th-century American women scientists
20th-century American engineers
21st-century American women